The 2009 CAF Super Cup was the 17th CAF Super Cup, an annual football match in Africa organized by the Confederation of African Football (CAF), between the winners of the previous season's two CAF club competitions, the CAF Champions League and the CAF Confederation Cup. The match was contested by 2008 CAF Champions League winners, Al-Ahly, and 2008 CAF Confederation Cup winners, CS Sfaxien at the International Stadium in Cairo on 6 February 2009.

Al-Ahly won the match 2–1, with two goals from Angolan striker Flávio, and won the title for the record fourth time (having won the Super Cup in 2002, 2006 and 2007), all of them under the management of Manuel José. CS Sfaxien finished as runners-up second year in a row.

Overall, this was the seventh Super Cup triumph for Egyptian clubs and the fifth time that a Tunisian club finished runners-up.

Teams

Match details

Champions

See also
2008 CAF Champions League
2008 CAF Confederation Cup

External links
Aboutrika misses Super Cup clash (BBC Sport)
Ahly win record fourth Super Cup (BBC Sport)
Flavio Gives Ahly CAF Super Cup (Goal.com)

References

Super
2009
Al Ahly SC matches
CS Sfaxien matches
Sports competitions in Cairo
Football in Cairo